Lohusa Şerbeti or Lohusa Sherbet is a traditional beverage in Turkey, made with water, sugar, cinnamon, cloves, and red food colour.  It is usually given to women after childbirth, but it is also now shared with visitors and friends as well.

References

Turkish drinks